Arcozelo is a Portuguese freguesia ("civil parish") in the municipality of Barcelos. The population in 2011 was 12,840, in an area of 3.44 km². It is the most populated parish in the municipality.

References

Freguesias of Barcelos, Portugal